"24/5" is a song by British singer and songwriter Mimi Webb, from her debut EP, Seven Shades of Heartbreak. It was released on 10 September 2021, through Epic Records. The song debuted at its peak of number 25 on the UK Singles Chart dated 17 September 2021.

Charts

References

2021 songs
2021 singles
Epic Records singles
Mimi Webb songs